The Central Texas & Colorado River Railway  is a short-line railroad headquartered in Brady, Texas. Formerly known as the Heart of Texas Railroad, the railroad operates a former Santa Fe branch line from an interchange with the BNSF Railway at Lometa to Brady. It acquired the line from the bankrupt Gulf, Colorado and San Saba Railway in 2013. The railroad is currently owned by OmniTrax. They bought the railroad in 2016.

History 
The Heart of Texas Railroad was organized in 2012 and acquired the  line from the bankrupt Gulf, Colorado and San Saba Railway in 2013. Operations began on January 29 of that year. The fire, of unknown origin, began on the western side of the trestle about 4 p.m.; by the time volunteer firefighters from Lometa arrived, the fire was uncontrollable. There were no injuries. At the time the potential loss to the company was estimated at $10 million. The company contracted with JCF Bridge & Concrete to replace the bridge, and the new span opened on May 16, 2014. The bridge cost $4 million.

OmniTRAX announced its acquisition of the company in May 2016.

In August 2019 OmniTRAX filed with the Surface Transportation Board to abandon the line, "citing its dim prospects and millions of dollars in operating losses since it acquired the route in 2016," according to an article in Trains News Wire. The article added: "The prime culprits: New crushed rock traffic that never materialized as expected and rapidly declining shipments of frac sand." Due to bridge problems and unsafe track requiring $2.3 million in repairs, the line had been placed under embargo on July 25, 2019. This would have been on top of the $2 million it has already spent to improve the line after acquiring it just a few years ago.

According to TNW, "A proposed rock-crushing facility was expected to generate 8,000 to 10,000 loads annually. But the facility never opened as planned in 2017 and is unlikely to ever be developed." Additionally, "The railroad expected to haul just 553 carloads in total this year, down from 1,210 in 2018."

Operations 
The CTXR interchanges with the BNSF Railway at Lometa. It primarily carries frac sand from hydraulic fracturing.

References

External links 

 Heart of Texas Railroad on JCF Bridge & Concrete

2013 establishments in Texas
Texas railroads